Ryan Stegman is a comic book artist, writer, and podcaster best known for his work on Marvel Comics characters including She-Hulk, X-23, Spider-Man and Venom.

Career
His first comic work was titled Magician Apprentice, based on the novel Magician published by Doubleday. In 2010, having already contributed to several works for the company, he signed an exclusivity agreement with Marvel. In late 2010, Stegman's She-Hulks was launched.

In January 2013 he and writer Dan Slott started the series The Superior Spider-Man. the series featuring the adventures of Spider-Man, now inhabited by the mind of Doctor Octopus. The first issue won the 2013 Diamond Gem Award for Comic Book of the Year Over $3.00. As part of the All-New, All-Different Marvel relaunch of Marvel's titles, Stegman teamed with writer Gerry Duggan to launch The Uncanny Avengers vol. 3 series in October 2015. From 2016 to 2017, he co-wrote The Amazing Spider-Man: Renew Your Vows. In 2018, Marvel Comics relaunched a new volume of Venom, with Donny Cates as writer and Stegman as artist. He drew the Absolute Carnage limited series in 2019. In July 2020, Marvel announced that Stegman would draw the limited series King in Black, the first issue of which was released in December 2020. In September 2022, he and Cates released the first issue of Vanish, Stegman's first creator-owned ongoing series.

Bibliography

Interior work

Marvel Comics 
 Magician Apprentice #4–12 (December 2006–February 2008)
 Marvel Adventures Spider-Man #39, 41 (July–September 2008)
 The Incredible Hercules #129–131 (July–September 2009)
Riftwar #1–5 (July–December 2009)
Incredible Hulk: #606–608, 714: "Where Is Wolverine?" (back-up stories, March 2010–May 2018)
Sif #1 (one-shot, June 2010)
 World War Hulks: "Object of Desire" (one-shot, June 2010)
 Heroic Age: Prince of Power #1 (July 2010)
She-Hulks #1–4 (January–April 2011)
 X-23 vol. 3 #8–9 (May–June 2011)
The Amazing Spider-Man: #665, 792–793 (September 2011–February 2018)
Fear Itself: Hulk vs. Dracula: #1–3 (November–December 2011)
 Point One: "The Scarlet Thread" (one-shot, January 2012)
Scarlet Spider vol. 2 #1–4, 6 (March–August 2012)
Fantastic Four vol. 1 #609–611 (October–December 2012)
Superior Spider-Man: #1–3, 9–10, 17–19 (March 2013–December 2013)
Wolverine vol. 6 #1–4 (April–June 2014)
Inhuman #4-12, Annual (October 2014–July 2015)
 Uncanny Inhumans #0: Evolution (writer, with Ryan Lee, June 2015)
 Avengers vol. 6 #0: "The Night That Hell Froze Over" (December 2015)
 Uncanny Avengers vol. 3 #1–4, 7–8, 13–14 (December 2015–November 2016)
 Amazing Spider-Man: Renew Your Vows #1–4, 6–12 (co-writer/artist on #8, co-plotter & writer on #9 with Juan Frigeri, writer on #10–12 with Nathan Stockman and Brian Level, January–December 2017)
 Amazing Spider-Man: Venom Inc. Alpha (one-shot, February 2018)
 Amazing Spider-Man: Venom Inc. Omega (one-shot, March 2018)
 Invincible Iron Man vol. 1 #598: "Where Is Wolverine?" (back-up story, May 2018)
 X-Men: Red #2: "Where Is Wolverine?" (back-up story, May, 2018)
Venom vol. 4 #1–11, 35 (July 2018–June 2021)
 Web of Venom: Unleashed (writer, one-shot, with Kyle Hotz, March 2019)
 Free Comic Book Day Spider-Man/Venom (July 2019–September 2020)
 Absolute Carnage #1–5 (October 2019–January 2020)
 Incoming!: "45–48" (one-shot, February 2020)
 King in Black #1–5 (February 2021–May 2021)
 Amazing Fantasy #1000: "Spider-Man vs. Conspiriton" (one-shot, August 2022)
 Miracleman #0: "Blood on the Snow" (writer/artist, one-shot, October 2022)

Other publishers 

 AAM-Markosia
 Midnight Kiss #0–5 (August 2005–May 2006)
 Wagon Wheel Comics
 Teddy and the Yeti #1 (December 2009)
 Image Comics
 Vanish #1– (September 2022–ongoing)

Cover work
Image Comics

 God Hates Astronauts #9 (June 2015)
 Citizen Jack #6 (May 2016)
 Curse Words #6 (July 2017)
 Undiscovered Country #8 (September 2020)
 Crossover #1 (November 2020)
 Nocterra #7 (February 2022)

Marvel Comics 
Fear Itself: Deadpool #1–3 (August–October 2011)
 Deadpool vol. 2 #49–49.1 (March 2012)
FF vol. 1: #22 (November 2012)
Scarlet Spider vol. 2 #1–25 (March 2012–February 2014)
 Fantastic Four vol. 1 #609–611 (October–December 2012)
 Superior Spider-Man vol. 1 #1–3, 9, 17–19, 26 (March 2013–March 2014)
 Infinity #4 (December 2013)
Wolverine vol. 6 #1–7 (April–July 2014)
 She-Hulk vol. 3 #1 (April 2014)
Avengers World #9 (September 2014)
 Inhuman #4–14, Annual (October 2014–July 2015)
 Uncanny Avengers vol. 3 #1–4, 7–8, 10–14, 23 (December 2015–July 2017)
 Amazing Spider-Man & Silk: The Spider(fly) Effect #4 (August 2016)
 Uncanny Inhumans #12–14 (October–December 2016)
 Amazing Spider-Man: Renew Your Vows #1–9, 11–16, 18, 20 (January 2017–August 2018)
 Secret Empire: United (August 2017)
 Amazing Spider-Man: Venom Inc. Alpha (February 2018)
 Amazing Spider-Man vol. 1 #792 (February 2018)
 Amazing Spider-Man: Venom Inc. Omega (March 2018)
 New Mutants: Dead Souls #1–6 (May–October 2018)
 Venom vol. 1 #164–165 (June 2018)
 X-Men: Gold vol. 2 #25 (June 2018)
 Venom vol. 4 #1–13, 25– (July 2018-June 2021)
 Web of Venom: Ve'Nam (one-shot, October 2018)
 Web of Venom: Unleashed (one-shot, March 2019)
 Amazing Spider-Man vol. 5 #25 (July 2019)
 Free Comic Book Day Spider-Man/Venom (July 2019–September 2020)
 Wolverine: Exit Wounds (one-shot, August 2019)
 Absolute Carnage #1–5 (October 2019–January 2020)
 Scream: Curse of Carnage #4–5 (April–May 2020)
 Thor vol. 6 #4 (May 2020)
 Fantastic Four: Antithesis #1 (October 2020)
 Power Pack vol. 4 #1 (January 2021)
 King in Black 1–5 (February–April 2021)
 Ghost Rider: Return of Vengeance #1 (one-shot, February 2021)
Maestro: War and Pax #1 (March 2021)

Other publishers 

 AAM-Markosia
 Scatterbrain #1 (variant, March 2005)
 ComixTribe
 And Then Emily Was Gone #0 (May 2015)
 Devil's Due Publishing
 Hack/Slash: The Series #31 (February 2010)
 Harris Comics
 Vampirella: The Second Coming #3 (variant, November 2009)
 Indiegogo
 Deathshroud #1 (February 2021 )
 Titan
 Man Plus #1 (January 2016)
 Zenescope Entertainment
 Grimm Fairy Tales #27-28, 35-36 (May 2008–March 2009)
 Beyond Wonderland #3–4 (October–December 2008)
 1001 Arabian Nights: The Adventures of Sinbad #7 (January 2009)
 Escape from Wonderland #2 (October 2009)
 Valiant Entertainment
 Bloodshot U.S.A. #1 (October 2016)

References

External links
Ryan Stegman's official blog

Comic Books Featuring Work by Ryan Stegman", Marvel.com

American comics artists
Living people
1981 births